Thomas Francis Gilroy (June 3, 1840 – December 1, 1911) was the 89th mayor of New York City from 1893 to 1894.

Biography

Gilroy was born in Sligo, Ireland, and immigrated with his parents to New York City at age seven. His father died soon afterwards, and he left school at age 16 to begin working in the publishing business, where he eventually became a proofreader. He later served as a court clerk, and Deputy County Clerk and Undersheriff for New York County.

Active in the Democratic Party, from his early 20s he was a key member of the Tammany Hall organization, beginning as a messenger for "Boss" William Tweed, and serving as confidential secretary for Henry W. Genet, Tweed's Tammany Hall successor.

In 1889, Gilroy managed the successful mayoral campaign of Hugh J. Grant, and as a reward was appointed Commissioner of Public Works, a post he held from 1889 to 1893.

From 1890 to 1892 Gilrow was the titular head of Tammany Hall, the organization's Grand Sachem. In fact, the boss of the organization continued to be Richard Croker, who was the organization's unofficial leader from 1886 to 1902.

In 1893 Gilroy succeeded Grant as Mayor. His administration was largely defined by the 1894 Lexow Investigation, which uncovered widespread police department corruption that was directly linked to Tammany. Gilroy did not run for reelection, and was succeeded in 1895 by reform candidate William L. Strong, who ran with the backing of Republicans and anti-Tammany Democrats.

Gilroy was a Delegate to the 1896 Democratic National Convention. Afterwards, he withdrew from politics, and served as President of the Twelfth Ward Bank until retiring in 1901.

Family
He had a daughter, Frances E. Gilroy, who married Edward A. Maher Jr.

Death and burial
He died on December 1, 1911 at his home on Ocean Avenue, Far Rockaway, Long Island and he was buried at Woodlawn Cemetery in the Bronx.

References

External links
 

Thomas F. Gilroy in Tammany Times 4th of July Souvenir (1894)

1840 births
1911 deaths
19th-century Irish people
People from Sligo (town)
New York (state) Democrats
Leaders of Tammany Hall
Irish emigrants to the United States (before 1923)
Mayors of New York City
Burials at Woodlawn Cemetery (Bronx, New York)
19th-century American politicians